When Calls the Heart is an American television drama series, inspired by Janette Oke's book of the same name from her Canadian West series, and developed by Michael Landon Jr. The series began airing on the Hallmark Channel in the United States on January 11, 2014, and, in Canada, on April 16, 2014, on Super Channel.

The series originated from a two-hour television movie pilot in October 2013, starring Maggie Grace as young teacher Elizabeth Thatcher and Stephen Amell as Royal North-West Mounted Police officer Wynn Delaney. In the television series Erin Krakow plays the lead role alongside an ensemble cast.

On March 21, 2018, Hallmark renewed the series for a sixth season. The season premiered with a two-hour Christmas special that was broadcast as part of Hallmark's Countdown to Christmas event, and was to continue for a 10-episode run starting in February 2019. However, due to the 2019 college admissions bribery scandal involving Loughlin and her subsequent removal from all Hallmark properties, the season was put on a "retooling" hiatus and resumed in May to conclude in June, with Loughlin's scenes edited out.

On June 17, 2022, the series was renewed for a tenth season. On February 22, 2023, ahead of the tenth season premiere, the series was renewed for an eleventh season.

Plot
When Calls the Heart tells the story of Elizabeth Thatcher (Erin Krakow), a young teacher accustomed to her high-society life. She receives her first classroom assignment in Coal Valley, a small coal-mining town in Western Canada which is located just south of Robb, Alberta. There, life is simple, but often fraught with challenges. Elizabeth charms most everyone in Coal Valley, except Royal North-West Mounted Police Constable Jack Thornton (Daniel Lissing). He believes Thatcher's wealthy father has doomed the lawman's career by insisting he be assigned in town to protect the shipping magnate's daughter. Wishing to thrive in this 1910 coal town, Elizabeth must learn the ways of the Canadian frontier.

Abigail Stanton's (Lori Loughlin) husband (the foreman of the mine), her only son, and 45 other miners, were killed in an explosion, due to the mining-company site manager's irresponsible management and lack of due care in his management of the mine. The newly widowed women find their faith tested when they must go to work in the mine to keep a roof over their heads, food on the table, and help pay the wage for the town's teacher. The town of Coal Valley was renamed Hope Valley in first episode of the second season after the coal mine was closed.

Episodes

Cast and characters

Main
Erin Krakow as Elizabeth Thatcher Thornton: Elizabeth Thatcher is a passionate young teacher from city life. She found herself in Coal Valley, a small community on the Canadian frontier in need of a teacher, and quickly discovers it is not an easy place to live, lacking the creature comforts and luxuries of her privileged life with her family. After marrying Jack, she loses him; shortly after the funeral, she finds out that she is expecting. Elizabeth meets businessman Lucas Bouchard a year after Jack's passing. They form a friendship based on their similar interests and strong intellectual connection. Lucas immediately falls in love with Elizabeth, but Elizabeth is still grieving Jack. The two eventually start dating, but he lets her go when he senses unresolved tension between Elizabeth and Nathan. This enables Elizabeth to recognize that her feelings for Nathan are her feelings for Jack that she has projected onto him. She realizes that she is in love with Lucas and they begin a courtship. Lucas proposes to Elizabeth in the Season 9 finale and she happily accepts.
Daniel Lissing as Jack Thornton (seasons 1–5): Jack Thornton is a Mountie and a man of stout character and integrity. He often finds himself protecting and saving people. Upon his first meeting of Elizabeth, Jack developed an instant dislike and it appeared she irritated him. However, as like Elizabeth, he grew to like her and eventually falls in love with her over time. He "dies" off-screen in a Mountie training camp in Season 5.
Lori Loughlin as Abigail Stanton (seasons 1–6): Abigail Stanton is a Coal Valley woman whose husband and son died in the mining accident. She is a very kind woman, and she stands strongly for the things she believes in. She is one of the first women to welcome Elizabeth and the two women quickly become friends. Abigail's character was written off the show, halfway through season 6, after Loughlin's involvement in the 2019 college admissions bribery scandal, through the idea that Abigail had travelled "back east" to take care of her sick mother.
Chelah Horsdal as Cat Montgomery (season 1): A woman of strong faith who teaches Sunday school after the church is destroyed. She is Gabe, Miles and Emily's  mother.
Martin Cummins as Henry Gowen: Henry Gowen is a businessman who owned the late Coal Valley mining company and was arrested for stealing town funds. With the help of Abigail, he is given a second chance and starts his own oil business in the town.
Jack Wagner as Bill Avery: Bill Avery is a quiet but skilled man who acts as the town's sheriff and becomes the town's judge.
Pascale Hutton as Rosemary LeVeaux Coulter: Rosemary is a flamboyant, enthusiastic actress from New York. She was briefly engaged to Jack Thornton, but called it off due to their differences. She decides to stay in town, eventually falling in love with the sawmill owner, Lee Coulter. 
Kavan Smith as Leland Coulter (season 2–present): Lee Coulter is a kind, laid-back, patient man, who opens a sawmill in Hope Valley. He marries Rosemary.
Andrea Brooks as Faith Carter (recurring seasons 2–5 & 7; main seasons 6, 8–present): Faith Carter is a nurse who visits from Elizabeth's home city to come work in Hope Valley. She falls in love with Carson.
Paul Greene as Carson Shepherd (recurring season 4–5; main seasons 6–8): Carson Shepherd is a doctor who works in Hope Valley and falls in love with Faith.
Eva Bourne as Clara Stanton Flynn (recurring season 2–5; main season 6–8): Clara Stanton is Abigail's daughter-in-law who works at the Cafe and marries Jesse Flynn. 
Aren Buchholz as Jesse Flynn (recurring seasons 3–5; main seasons 6–8): Jesse is a former outlaw, who now lives in Hope Valley. He marries Clara.
Chris McNally as Lucas Bouchard (season 6–present): Lucas Bouchard is a businessman who owns the Queen of Hearts saloon and Gowen Petroleum. He donates a building to Elizabeth so that she can open a public library for the town. Lucas and Elizabeth begin dating in Season 8 before briefly breaking up over misunderstandings. They reunite in the Season 8 finale and begin an official courtship after sharing their first kiss. Lucas and Elizabeth proclaim their love for each other and he proposes to her in the Season 9 finale, which she happily accepts.
Kevin McGarry as Nathan Grant (season 6–present): Nathan Grant comes to Hope Valley with his niece, Allie. Nathan develops feelings for Elizabeth but is unable to ask her out. He proclaims his love for her in Season 8, but she rushes away in shock. It is eventually revealed that Nathan came to Hope Valley to protect Elizabeth and her son as he feels guilty that Jack died while he took his place for the training assignment. In the Season 8 finale, Elizabeth informs Nathan that she is not in love with him but will always care for him as a friend.
Viv Leacock as Joseph Canfield (recurring season 8; main season 9–present): A delivery driver who moves to Hope Valley and becomes the new pastor.

Recurring
Charlotte Hegele as Julie Thatcher:  Elizabeth's younger sister who longs for romance and adventure (seasons 1–2, 5–6)
Erica Carroll as Dottie Ramsey: A curious woman who is interested in everything happening in town (seasons 1–5)
Loretta Walsh as Florence Blakeley Yost: A Hope Valley resident who is known to gossip. She later marries Ned Yost. (seasons 1–present)
Johannah Newmarch as Molly Sullivan: A Hope Valley resident who is the mother of Rosaleen. She worked for Bill as an office cleaner. She later becomes the receptionist and Carson's assistant at the infirmary. (seasons 1–present)
Hrothgar Mathews as Ned Yost: The owner and proprietor of the town's Mercantile. He has a daughter named Katie. He later marries Florence Blakeley. (season 1–present)
Ben Rosenbaum as Mike Hickam: A resident of Hope Valley who's worked at the mercantile, Lee's sawmill, and Gowen Petroleum. (Season 1-present)
Laura Bertram as Mary Dunbar-Graves: A woman who is left to care for her young son, Caleb, after her husband is killed in the mining accident. She later remarries a coal miner, Dewitt Graves in Season 2. (seasons 1–3)
Steve Bacic as Charles Spurlock (seasons 1): A Pinkerton agent who worked for Henry Gowen.
Gracyn Shinyei as Emily Montgomery (season 1–present): A student of Elizabeth's
Mitchell Kummen as Gabe Montgomery (seasons 1–2): a student of Elizabeth's who is Emily's older brother
Mark Humphrey as Frank Hogan (seasons 2–5): Former outlaw turned pastor who puts down roots in Hope Valley.
Max Lloyd-Jones as Tom Thornton (seasons 2, 5):  Jack's rebellious younger brother who enjoys flirting with Julie
Garwin Sanford as William Thatcher (seasons 2, 5):  Elizabeth's father who does not approve of her life in Coal Valley
Lynda Boyd as Grace Thatcher (season 2): Elizabeth's mother who falls ill
Marcus Rosner as Charles Kensington (season 2): An old childhood friend of Elizabeth's who works for her father and has unreturned romantic feelings for her
Kristina Wagner as Nora Avery (seasons 2–3): Bill's former wife who became distant after her young son died. 
Ava Grace Cooper as Opal Weiss: A young student of Elizabeth's. She often carries a teddy bear named Brownie with her. (seasons 3–present)
Christian Michael Cooper as Timmy Lawson: A young aspiring musician who is a student of Elizabeth's. (seasons 3–present)
Genea Charpentier as Laura Campbell: A young Hope Valley resident who was a student of Elizabeth's. After aging out of school in Season 6, she begins working for Elizabeth as Little Jack's nanny. (seasons 3–present)
Carter Ryan Evancic as Cody Stanton (seasons 3–6):  A young orphan who was adopted by Abigail along with his older sister, Becky. He was written off the show along with Abigail due to the college scandal. 
Spencer Drever as Cyrus Rivera (season 4)
Jeremy Guilbaut as Ray Wyatt (season 4)
Kayla Wallace as Fiona Miller (season 6–present)
Jaeda Lily Miller as Allie Grant (season 6–present): Nathan Grant's niece. She is thrilled when her uncle legally adopts her.
Clayton James as Kevin Townsend (season 5–7) 
Natasha Burnett as Minnie Canfield (season 8–present): Joseph's wife. She enjoys cooking and later starts working at the café.

Notable guest stars
James Brolin as Circuit Judge Jedidiah Black (season 1)
Brooke Shields as Charlotte Thornton (season 3)
Josie Bissett as AJ Foster (seasons 4–5)
Niall Matter as Shane Cantrell (season 4)
Michael Hogan as Archie Grant (season 7)
Teryl Rothery as Helen Bouchard (season 8)

Production
The series, originally planned to be filmed in Colorado, is filmed south of Vancouver, British Columbia, on a farm surrounded by vineyards. The fictional frontier town of Coal Valley (later Hope Valley) was erected in late 2013. Some of the set trimmings and a stage coach came from the Hell on Wheels set. The Thatcher home is the University Women's Club of Vancouver.

The series was renewed for a second season, which aired from April 25 to June 13, 2015. Hallmark Channel announced in July 2015 that the series had been renewed for a third season, which aired from February 21 to April 10, 2016, with a sneak peek airing during the 2015 Christmas season.

In mid-2016, it was announced that Season 4 would premiere on the Hallmark Channel Christmas Day with a two-hour special. On April 11, 2016, Lissing and Krakow announced via the series' Facebook page that Hallmark Channel had renewed the series for a fourth season, which aired from February 19 to April 23, 2017.

On April 24, 2017, series star Erin Krakow announced via the Hallmark Channel website that the show would return for a fifth season, which premiered in February 2018 and ended in April. Filming for season five began in Vancouver on August 22, 2017, and ended on December 21, 2017.

On March 14. 2019, Hallmark announced it had dropped Loughlin from future company projects due to her role in the 2019 college admissions bribery scandal. On April 10, 2019, it was announced that season six would resume on May 5, 2019, with Loughlin's scenes edited out.

On April 13, 2019, the series was renewed for a seventh season which aired February 23 to April 26, 2020.

On April 26, 2020, Hallmark Channel announced via a video from Krakow that the series would return for an eighth season, which aired from February 21 to May 9, 2021.

On May 9, 2021, Hallmark Channel announced via a video from Krakow that the series would return for a ninth season, which aired from March 6 to May 22, 2022.

On June 17, 2022, the series was renewed for a tenth season. 

On February 22, 2023, ahead of the tenth season premiere, the series was renewed for a 12-episode eleventh season

Broadcast
The first season of the series was subsequently picked up by CBC Television for rebroadcast as a summer series in 2015. The network has since aired all six seasons. The series became available internationally on Netflix in August 2017, but was taken off in early 2021. Seasons 7-9 were added to Peacock in November 2022.

Spin-off
A spin-off of the show, When Hope Calls, was announced at Hallmark's Television Critics Association summer press tour on July 26, 2018. The series debuted on August 30, 2019, as the initial offering of the Hallmark Movies Now streaming service. The second season airs on Great American Family.

References

External links

 Official website
 

2010s American drama television series
2010s American romance television series
2010s Canadian drama television series
2020s American drama television series
2020s American romance television series
2020s Canadian drama television series
2014 American television series debuts
2014 Canadian television series debuts
Canadian romance television series
CBC Television original programming
English-language television shows
Hallmark Channel original programming
Period family drama television series
Super Channel (Canadian TV channel) original programming
Television shows based on Canadian novels
Television shows filmed in Vancouver
Television series set in the 1910s
Television shows set in Alberta
2010s Western (genre) television series
2020s Western (genre) television series
Canadian Western (genre) television series